Milica Brozović, sometimes Meliza Brozovich, (born 17 October 1983) is a former competitive pair skater. Skating with Anton Nimenko for Russia, she became the 1998 Nebelhorn Trophy bronze medalist and won four ISU Junior Grand Prix medals. Representing Slovakia with Vladimir Futáš, she won silver at the 2004 Ondrej Nepela Memorial. She competed in the final segment at four ISU Championships.

Skating career 
Brozović began learning to skate in 1990. Starting in 1998, she appeared internationally for Russia with Anton Nimenko.

Brozović/Nimenko received the bronze medal at the 1998 Nebelhorn Trophy in late August. Competing in the 1998–1999 ISU Junior Grand Prix series, they won gold in September in Mexico City, Mexico, and took silver the following month in Beijing, China. They finished fifth at the 1999 World Junior Championships, held in late November in Zagreb, Croatia; and fourth at the Junior Grand Prix Final, which took place in March in Detroit, Michigan, United States.

Competing in the 1999–2000 ISU Junior Grand Prix series, Brozović/Nimenko won silver at a September event in Zagreb and bronze at their October assignment in The Hague, Netherlands. At the 2000 Russian Championships, they finished fifth competing in the senior ranks and then took bronze at the junior event. In March, they placed seventh at the 2000 World Junior Championships in Oberstdorf, Germany.

In October 2000, Brozović/Nimenko placed fourth at the 1999–2000 ISU Junior Grand Prix in Ostrava, Czech Republic. It was their final international together. Nina Mozer coached the pair in Moscow.

In the spring of 2003, Brozović teamed up with Vladimir Futáš to compete for Slovakia. During their first season together, they appeared at one Grand Prix event, placing 8th at the 2003 NHK Trophy, and became the Slovak national champions. They placed 14th at the 2004 European Championships in Budapest, Hungary; and 15th at the 2004 World Championships in Dortmund, Germany.

In their second and final season together, Brozović/Futáš took silver at the 2004 Ondrej Nepela Memorial and finished 9th at a Grand Prix competition, the 2004 Skate Canada International. They were coached by Vladimir Dvojnikov in Bratislava.

Programs

With Futáš

With Nimenko

Competitive highlights
GP: Grand Prix; JGP: ISU Junior Grand Prix

With Futáš for Slovakia

With Nimenko for Russia

References

External links 

 

Slovak female pair skaters
Russian female pair skaters
Living people
1983 births
Sportspeople from Belgrade